Drifa is a genus of soft corals in the family Alcyoniidae. Only one species is accepted to belong to this genus, Drifa Glomerata

References

Nephtheidae